Lalbagh is a neighbourhood of the Dhaka District in the division of Dhaka, Bangladesh.

Geography
The district has since split, with a population density of 168,151 people per square km, and 369,933 inhabitants in its  area per 2011 census making it one of the most densely populated administrative subdivisions in the world.

Banks
Almost every bank operating in the country has an outlet in Lalbagh. Foreign banks such as Citi, and Standard Chartered also have branches there.

Markets
 Chowk Bazaar

Lalbagh Police Station is located at Road No.: 17, Shahid Nagar, Dhaka, Bangladesh.

References

Old Dhaka
Thanas of Dhaka
Neighbourhoods in Dhaka